Cardinal Messias (Italian: Abuna Messias) is a 1939 Italian historical drama film directed by Goffredo Alessandrini and starring Camillo Pilotto, Enrico Glori and Mario Ferrari. The film was awarded the Mussolini Cup at the 1939 Venice film festival. It portrays the life of Guglielmo Massaia, a nineteenth-century Italian known for his missionary work in the Ethiopian Empire.

Cast
 Camillo Pilotto as il cardinale Guglielmo Massaia, detto Abuna Messias
Enrico Glori as il re Menelik
Mario Ferrari as Abuna Atanasio
Amedeo Trilli as Ghebrà Selassié, il consigliere di Alem
Berché Zaitù Taclè as la principessa Alem
Ippolito Silvestri as il re Johannes
Francesco Sala as il marchese Antinori
Roberto Pasetti as padre Leone
Abd-el-Uad as il capo indigeno Abu Beker
Oscar Andriani as padre Reginaldo Giuliani
Corrado Racca as Camillo Benso, conte di Cavour

References

Bibliography 
 Moliterno, Gino. The A to Z of Italian Cinema. Scarecrow Press, 2009.

External links 
 

1939 films
Italian historical drama films
1930s historical drama films
1930s Italian-language films
Films directed by Goffredo Alessandrini
Films set in the 19th century
Films set in Ethiopia
Italian black-and-white films
1939 drama films
1930s Italian films